Australia Dairy Company is a traditional Hong Kong restaurant, cha chaan teng, in Jordan, Hong Kong, specialising in steamed milk pudding, scrambled eggs, toast and custard dishes. The company was named by the founder, who had worked on an Australian farm in the 1940s.

The restaurant's brand name was coined from its high quality dairy ingredients being specifically imported from Australia. Founded in 1970 by the Tang family, it is one of the oldest restaurants in Hong Kong. It has been mentioned by The Guardian as one of the top 10 budget restaurants in Hong Kong.

The restaurant is notable for its efficient but often rude service, with a short average customer visit length of only 10 minutes. It is also famous for its signature egg custard pudding and scrambled eggs. It has been described as an iconic Hong Kong restaurant.

Reception

The restaurant has received various accolades in recent years, having been recommended by Asian lifestyle magazine CNNGo in their Best Eats Awards for 2010, and winner of the OpenRice Best Restaurant Awards, in the district and cuisine categories (Best Restaurant in Tsim Sha Tsui (2014–15); Best Hong Kong Style Tea Restaurant (2008–2015)). Additionally, it has been mentioned by The Guardian as one of the top 10 budget restaurants in Hong Kong.

It has been described as an iconic Hong Kong restaurant, a Hong Kong institution. Writing in The New York Times style magazine, Jade Lai sums up its aesthetic as "I like the aesthetic of this place—it's very Wong Kar-wai."

See also
List of restaurants in Hong Kong

References

Further reading

 Lee, Y. K., & Song, K. (2013). "Meaning making in organizations: Lessons from Australia Dairy Company". City University of Hong Kong.

Restaurants in Hong Kong
Australian-themed retailers